Wellton is a town in Yuma County, Arizona, United States. According to the 2010 census, the population of the town is 2,882.  It is part of the Yuma Metropolitan Statistical Area.

Geography
Wellton is located at  (32.671436, -114.140972).

Wellton is located along Interstate 8 and the former route of U.S. Route 80.  It is a junction on the Union Pacific Railroad (formerly Southern Pacific), where the lines to Phoenix and  Maricopa diverge.  Amtrak's Sunset Limited and Texas Eagle pass through the town without stopping. The town was named after the wells providing water for the railroad.

Demographics

At the 2000 census, there were 1,829 people, 700 households, and 552 families in the town. The racial makeup of the town was 68.2% White, 2.0% Black or African American, 1.4% Native American, 0.3% Asian, 0.2% Pacific Islander, 25.4% from other races, and 2.5% from two or more races. 40.7% of the population were Hispanic or Latino of any race.

Of the 700 households 25.7% had children under the age of 18 living with them, 69.4% were married couples living together, 6.1% had a female householder with no husband present, and 21.1% were non-families. 17.7% of households were one person and 10.7% were one person aged 65 or older. The average household size was 2.61 and the average family size was 2.95.

The age distribution was 23.9% under the age of 18, 6.7% from 18 to 24, 17.4% from 25 to 44, 24.0% from 45 to 64, and 28.0% 65 or older. The median age was 47 years. For every 100 females, there were 98.6 males. For every 100 females age 18 and over, there were 96.9 males.

The median household income was $27,045 and the median family income  was $30,071. Males had a median income of $27,292 versus $21,250 for females. The per capita income for the town was $13,644. About 16.1% of families and 21.3% of the population were below the poverty line, including 36.9% of those under age 18 and 10.0% of those age 65 or over.

Population
During the winter season, the population virtually doubles with snowbirds from the western US as well as the western provinces of Canada filling up the many RV parks. Wellton is becoming a popular retirement destination.

The town currently operates two 18-hole golf courses that are a magnet for winter visitors. Much development is happening centered on the newer golf course and also in more rural areas as well.

Economy
Five Rivers Cattle Feeding operates a feedlot outside Wellton. US Border Patrol has a station outside of Wellton.

Transportation
 Yuma County Area Transit
 Interstate 8

Gallery

References

External links
 Town website 

Towns in Yuma County, Arizona